Frei Paul Otto (31 May 1925 – 9 March 2015) was a German architect and structural engineer noted for his use of lightweight structures, in particular tensile and membrane structures, including the roof of the Olympic Stadium in Munich for the 1972 Summer Olympics.

Otto won the RIBA Royal Gold Medal in 2006 and was awarded the Pritzker Architecture Prize in 2015, shortly before his death.

Early life
He studied architecture in Berlin before being drafted into the Luftwaffe as a fighter pilot in the last years of World War II. He was interned in a prisoner of war camp near Chartres (France) and with his aviation engineering training and lack of material and an urgent need for housing, began experimenting with tents for shelter. After the war he studied briefly in the US and visited Erich Mendelsohn, Mies van der Rohe, Richard Neutra, and Frank Lloyd Wright.

Career

He began a private practice in Germany in 1952. He earned a doctorate in tensioned constructions in 1954. His saddle-shaped cable-net music pavilion at the Bundesgartenschau (Federal Garden Exposition) in Kassel 1955 brought him his first significant attention. 

Otto specialised in lightweight tensile and membrane structures, and pioneered advances in structural mathematics and civil engineering. He founded the Institute for Lightweight Structures at the University of Stuttgart in 1964 and headed the institute until his retirement as university professor. Major works include the West German Pavilion at the Montreal Expo in 1967 and the roof of the 1972 Munich Olympic Arena. He has lectured worldwide and taught at the Architectural Association School of Architecture, where he also designed some of the research facilities buildings of the school's forest campus in Hooke Park.

Until his death, Otto remained active as an architect and engineer, and as consultant to his protégé Mahmoud Bodo Rasch for a number of projects in the Middle East. One of his more recent projects was his work with Shigeru Ban on the Japanese Pavilion at Expo 2000 with a roof structure made entirely of paper, and together with SL Rasch GmbH Special and Lightweight Structures he designed a convertible roof for the Venezuelan Pavilion. In an effort to memorialise the September 11 attacks and its victims as early as 2002, Otto envisioned the two footprints of the World Trade Center buildings covered with water and surrounded by trees; his plan includes a world map embedded in the park with countries at war marked with lights and a continuously updated board announcing the number of people killed in war from 11 September 2001, onward.

On request of :de:Christoph Ingenhoven, Otto designed the "Light eyes" for Stuttgart 21. – drop-shaped overlights in the park, that descend onto the tracks to support the ceiling. Otto remarked in 2010 that the construction should be stopped because of the difficult geology.

Otto died on 9 March 2015; he was to be publicly announced as the winner of the 2015 Pritzker Prize on 23 March but his death meant the committee announced his award on 10 March. Otto himself had been told earlier that he had won the prize by the executive director of the Pritzker Prize, Martha Thorne. He was reported to have said, "I've never done anything to gain this prize. Prize winning is not the goal of my life. I try to help poor people, but what shall I say here — I'm very happy."

List of buildings
This is a partial list of buildings designed by Otto:
 1957 – Tanzbrunnen pavillion Rheinpark Cologne, Germany
 1967 – West Germany Pavilion at Expo 67 Montreal, Canada
 1972 – Roof for Olympic Stadium, Munich, Germany
 1974 – Convention Center in Mecca, Saudi Arabia
 1975 – Multihalle, Mannheim, Germany
 1977 – Umbrellas for 1977 Pink Floyd tour
 1980 – Aviary at Munich Zoo, Germany
 1985 – Tuwaiq Palace, Saudi Arabia, with Buro Happold
 1987–91– Housing at the International Building Exhibition Berlin, Germany
 2000 – Roof structure of the Japanese Pavilion at Expo 2000, Hanover Germany (provided engineering assistance with Buro Happold and architectural collaboration with Shigeru Ban)

Awards (selected)
 1974 – Thomas Jefferson Medal in Architecture
 1980 – Honorary doctorate of science from the University of Bath
 1996/97 – Wolf Prize in Architecture
 2005 – Royal Gold Medal for architecture by RIBA
 2006 – Praemium Imperiale in Architecture
 2015 – Pritzker Architecture Prize

See also
 Gridshell

References

Further reading
 Conrad Roland: Frei Otto – Spannweiten. Ideen und Versuche zum Leichtbau. Ein Werkstattbericht von Conrad Roland. Ullstein, Berlin, Frankfurt/Main und Wien 1965.
 Philip Drew: Frei Otto – Form and Structure, 1976, 
 Philip Drew: Tensile Architecture, 1979, 
 Muriel Emanuel, Dennis Sharp: "Contemporary Architects", New York: St. Martin's Press. 1980. p. 600. 
 Frei Otto, Bodo Rasch: Finding Form: Towards an Architecture of the Minimal, 1996, 
 Winfried Nerdinger: Frei Otto, Complete Works: Lightweight Construction – Natural Design, 2005,  - published on the occasion of the exhibition Frei Otto Lightweight Construction, Natural Design at the Architekturmuseum der Technischen Universität München in der Pinakothek der Moderne from 26 May to 28 August 2005, and cataloguing over 200 buildings and projects dating from the years 1951-2004

External links

 
 Frei Otto's official website
 Frei Otto: Spanning The Future Documentary film's official Website
 Japan Pavilion Expo 2000 – About the roof structure
 SL Rasch GmbH Homepage
 Last recorded interview with Frei Otto, about his life and receiving the Pritzker Prize
 Uncube Nr. 33 Frei Otto – by uncube magazine

1925 births
2015 deaths
German World War II pilots
People from Chemnitz
Structural engineers
Tensile architecture
High-tech architecture
Tensile membrane structures
Washington University in St. Louis faculty
Studienstiftung alumni
Officers Crosses of the Order of Merit of the Federal Republic of Germany
Recipients of the Order of Merit of Baden-Württemberg
Pritzker Architecture Prize winners
Recipients of the Royal Gold Medal
Wolf Prize in Arts laureates
Recipients of the Praemium Imperiale
Members of the Academy of Arts, Berlin
20th-century German architects
German prisoners of war in World War II held by France